Ka Fuk Estate is a public housing estate in Fanling, New Territories, Hong Kong, near Fanling Highway. It consists of three residential buildings built in 1994.

Ka Shing Court is a Home Ownership Scheme court in Fanling, near Ka Fuk Estate. It consists of four residential buildings built in 1995.

Houses

Ka Fuk Estate

Ka Shing Court

Demographics
According to the 2016 by-census, Ka Fuk Estate had a population of 6,322 while Ka Shing Court had a population of 7,123. Altogether the population amounts to 13,445.

Politics
Ka Fuk Estate and Ka Shing Court are located in Shing Fuk constituency of the North District Council. It is currently represented by Warwick Wan Wo-tat, who was elected in the 2019 elections.

See also

Public housing estates in Fanling

References

Residential buildings completed in 1994
Fanling
Public housing estates in Hong Kong